The 1978 Baltimore Orioles season was a season in American baseball. It involved the Orioles finishing fourth in the American League East with a record of 90 wins and 71 losses.

Offseason 
 November 23, 1977: Elrod Hendricks was signed as a free agent by the Orioles.
 December 7, 1977: Bryn Smith, Rudy May, and Randy Miller were traded by the Orioles to the Montreal Expos for Don Stanhouse, Joe Kerrigan, and Gary Roenicke.
 January 6, 1978: Ken Rudolph was released by the Orioles.
 February 21, 1978: Tony Muser was released by the Orioles.

Regular season

Season standings

Record vs. opponents

Opening Day starters 
Mark Belanger
Al Bumbry
Doug DeCinces
Rick Dempsey
Larry Harlow
Dennis Martínez
Lee May
Eddie Murray
Ken Singleton
Billy Smith

Notable transactions 
 June 6, 1978: 1978 Major League Baseball Draft
Cal Ripken Jr. was drafted by the Orioles in the 2nd round, (46th overall).  Player signed June 13, 1978.
Bobby Bonner was drafted by the Orioles in the 3rd round.
Mike Boddicker was drafted by the Orioles in the 6th round.

Roster

Player stats

Batting

Starters by position 
Note: Pos = Position; G = Games played; AB = At bats; H = Hits; Avg. = Batting average; HR = Home runs; RBI = Runs batted in

Other batters 
Note: G = Games played; AB = At bats; H = Hits; Avg. = Batting average; HR = Home runs; RBI = Runs batted in

Pitching

Starting pitchers 
Note: G = Games pitched; IP = Innings pitched; W = Wins; L = Losses; ERA = Earned run average; SO = Strikeouts

Other pitchers 
Note: G = Games pitched; IP = Innings pitched; W = Wins; L = Losses; ERA = Earned run average; SO = Strikeouts

Relief pitchers 
Note: G = Games pitched; W = Wins; L = Losses; SV = Saves; ERA = Earned run average; SO = Strikeouts

Farm system 

LEAGUE CHAMPIONS: Miami

Notes

References 

1978 Baltimore Orioles team page at Baseball Reference
1978 Baltimore Orioles season at baseball-almanac.com

Baltimore Orioles seasons
Baltimore Orioles season
Baltimore Orioles